Liobagrus anguillicauda is a species of catfish in the family Amblycipitidae (the torrent catfishes) endemic to the province of Fujian in China. This species reaches a length of  TL.

References

External links 

Liobagrus
Freshwater fish of China
Endemic fauna of China
Fish described in 1926